Giuseppina Grassi (born 28 January 1957) is a Sammarinese athlete. She competed in the women's high jump at the 1976 Summer Olympics.

References

1957 births
Living people
Athletes (track and field) at the 1976 Summer Olympics
Sammarinese female high jumpers
Olympic athletes of San Marino
Place of birth missing (living people)